Dog Boy (born Robert Rogers) is a singer and songwriter, currently signed with Suburban Noize Records as a solo artist. Along with his solo project he also supplied vocals for the reggae/punk rock band, Too Rude, who are also signed with Subnoize.

Biography
Along with bass guitarist Lazy Dread, Dog Boy created Too Rude. As time went by Dog Boy became more known for working on the Kottonmouth Kings' first three albums as a featured artist writing such hits as "On the Run" and "Dog's Life" which was featured on the soundtrack for 1999 film, Lost & Found. Whilst in this process Dogboy recorded the debut Too Rude which was released with Suburban Noize Records on 4 April 2000.

After the first album, the second Re-Invention was not released until 26 October 2004.

With Rogers' success, he originally planned to work as a solo artist. Rebel Riddim was released on 3 April 2007. It reached No. 11 on Billboard's Top Reggae Albums chart.

Discography

Too Rude

Dog Boy

References

External links
Dog Boy Official Myspace
Suburban Noize Records Official Site
Too Rude Official Myspace 

Suburban Noize Records artists
Jamaican reggae singers
Jamaican male singers
Living people
Year of birth missing (living people)